Alexander Hamilton Institute for the Study of Western Civilization is an educational institute in Clinton, New York founded in 2007. Judge David Aldrich Nelson was a charter director. One of its board members is Jane Fraser.

History 
History professor Robert L. Paquette of Hamilton College in Clinton had led an attempt to create an "Alexander Hamilton Center" on the Hamilton College campus, but it was unsuccessful. A faculty vote voiced concern that the proposal to establish this alumni-financed center to study "capitalism, natural law and the role of religion in politics" would have an overt conservative political tendency and would not be subject to sufficient oversight by the school. The college's decision not to proceed drew criticism from conservative commentators, and the institute was established as an off-campus, independent entity. Since then, it has continued to host numerous speakers and hold events on-campus. It helps to maintain on-campus academic reading clusters and conservative organizations.

People 
People affiliated with the Alexander Hamilton Institute:
 James Bradfield, cofounder and Charter Fellow.
 David B. Frisk, Resident Fellow. 
 Jane Fraser, one of its board members.
 David Aldrich Nelson (1932–2010), its first director.
 David K. Nichols, senior fellow
 Mary P. Nichols, senior fellow
 Robert L. Paquette, cofounder and fellow
 Juliana Geran Pilon, Senior Fellow.

References

External links 
 Alexander Hamilton Institute website

2007 establishments in New York (state)
Hamilton College (New York)